The Billboard Hot 100 is a chart that ranks the best-performing singles of the United States. Its data, published by Billboard magazine and compiled by Nielsen SoundScan, is based collectively on each single's weekly physical and digital sales, as well as airplay and streaming. At the end of a year, Billboard will publish an annual list of the 100 most successful songs throughout that year on the Hot 100 chart based on the information. For 2022, the list was published on December 1, calculated with data from  November 20, 2021 to November 12, 2022. At the number-one position was Glass Animals' "Heat Waves", which spent 5 weeks on top of the Billboard Hot 100. It accumulated a total of 91 weeks on the chart, which is the longest-charting song in the 64-year history of the Billboard Hot 100.

The 2022 Billboard Hot 100 Year-End list is also notable for being one of five Billboard Year-End lists that featured 14 songs that appeared in the previous year (in this case 2021's) repeat onto to this list. With the highest being the number one song of the year, Glass Animals' "Heat Waves", which first appeared onto 2021's list at number 16. This also made "Heat Waves" the first song in Billboard Hot 100 history to repeat at number 1 on a Hot 100 year-end list. Only four more year-end list would repeat the same feat, that being 1997, 2010, 2016 and 2018.

Year-end list

See also
 2022 in American music
 List of Billboard Hot 100 number ones of 2022
 List of Billboard Hot 100 top-ten singles in 2022

References

United States Hot 100 Year end
Billboard charts
2022 in American music